Concealing a Burglar is a 1908 American silent short drama film directed by D. W. Griffith.

Cast
 Arthur V. Johnson as Mr. Brown
 Florence Lawrence as Mrs. Brown
 Harry Solter as Mr. Wells
 Linda Arvidson
 George Gebhardt as Dinner Guest
 Robert Harron as Valet
 Jeanie MacPherson as Dinner Guest
 Mack Sennett as The Waiter / A Policeman

References

External links
 

1908 films
1908 drama films
Silent American drama films
American silent short films
American black-and-white films
Films directed by D. W. Griffith
1908 short films
1900s American films